George Griffith (1857–1906), full name George Chetwynd Griffith-Jones, was a prolific British science fiction writer and noted explorer who wrote during the late Victorian and Edwardian age. Many of his visionary tales appeared in magazines such as Pearson's Magazine and Pearson's Weekly before being published as novels. Griffith was extremely popular in the United Kingdom, though he failed to find similar acclaim in the United States, in part due to his utopian socialist views. A journalist, rather than a scientist, by background, what his stories lack in scientific rigour and literary grace they make up for in sheer exuberance of execution.

"To-night that spark was to be shaken from the torch of Revolution, and to-morrow the first of the mines would explode...the armies of Europe would fight their way through the greatest war that the world had ever seen." – from Griffith's most famous novel The Angel of the Revolution.

Life
He was the son of a vicar who became a schoolmaster in his mid-20s.  After writing freelance articles in his spare time, he joined a newspaper for a short spell, then authored a series of secular pamphlets including Ananias, The Atheist's God: For the Attention of Charles Bradlaugh.  After the success of Admiral Philip H. Colomb's The Great War of 1892 (itself a version of the more famous The Battle of Dorking), Griffith, then on the staff of Pearson's Magazine as a clerk addressing envelopes and mailing labels, submitted a synopsis for a story entitled The Angel of the Revolution.  It remains his best and most famous work.  It was among the first of the so-called marvel tales, epitomised by Jules Verne. Marvel tales featured such things as heavier-than-air flying machines, compressed air guns, submarines, profoundly convenient political developments, wooden heroes with no readily apparent sexual tastes, and spectacular aerial, land, or undersea combat. Later novels, such as The Gold Finder developed the heroes' romantic interests. His short stories were very similar to the future war tales of George Chesney and his imitators along with the political utopianism of William Morris' News from Nowhere.  He wrote a sequel, serialised as The Syren of the Skies in Pearson's Magazine. It was later published as a novel titled with the name of its main character, Olga Romanoff.
  
Although overshadowed by H. G. Wells in the United States, Griffith's epic fantasies of romantic utopians in a future world of war, dominated by airship battle fleets, and grandiose engineering provided a template for steampunk novels 100 years before the term was even coined. Michael Moorcock claims that the works of George Griffith had a dramatic impact on his own writing. The concept of revolutionaries imposing "a pax aeronautica over the earth", at the center of The Angel of the Revolution, was taken up by Wells many years later, in The Shape of Things to Come. Wells himself once wrote that Griffith's Outlaws of the Air was an "aeronautical classic".

Though a less accomplished writer than Upton Sinclair, George Bernard Shaw, and H.G. Wells, his novels were extremely popular in their day, seeing many printings . Griffith's stories foreshadowed World War I and foretold a utopian communist revolution in the United States. It also predicted that Great Britain would ally itself with Germany against a Franco-Russian-Italian alliance, almost the exact opposite of what actually happened when World War I started. Griffith also employed the concepts of the air to surface missile and VTOL aircraft. He wrote several tales of adventure set on contemporary earth, while The Outlaws of the Air depicted a future of aerial warfare and the creation of a Pacific island utopia.  Sam Moskowitz described him as "undeniably the most popular science fiction writer in England between 1893 and 1895."  Some of his books (especially The Gold Finder) also reflected a belief in the undesirability of racial mixing, due to a supposed deficiency in the black race. These beliefs were similar to those of some of the revolutionary type of socialists of the time, such as Jack London.

His science fiction depicted grand and unlikely voyages through the Solar System in the spirit of Wells or Jules Verne, though his explorers donned space suits remarkably prescient in their design.  Honeymoon in Space saw his newly married adventurers, exemplars of the "Race that Rules", exploring planets in different stages of geological and Darwinian evolution on an educational odyssey drawing heavily on earlier cosmic voyages by Camille Flammarion, W. S. Lach-Szyrma, and Edgar Fawcett. Its illustrations by Stanley L. Wood have proved more significant, providing the first depictions of slender, super-intelligent aliens with large, bald heads – the archetype of the famous Greys of modern science fiction.  His short story "The Great Crellin Comet", published in 1897, was the first story to not only include a 10-second countdown for a space launch (though a countdown of sorts is included in Jules Verne's 1887 novel, The Purchase of the North Pole), but also the first story to suggest that a cometary collision with Earth could be stopped by human intervention.

As an explorer of the real world, he shattered the existing record for voyaging around the world at the behest of Sir Arthur Pearson, completing his journey in just 65 days. He also helped discover the source of the Amazon River. This was documented in Pearson's Magazine before being published as a book, Around the World in 65 Days, in 2009.  He died of cirrhosis of the liver, at the age of 48, in 1906.

Legacy
His son was the engineer Alan Arnold Griffith, who was the originator of the Griffith crack theory concerning brittle materials such as glass.

Partial list of works

The Angel of the Revolution: A Tale of the Coming Terror (1893)
Olga Romanoff or The Syren of the Skies (1894)
The Outlaws of the Air (1895)
Valdar the Oft-Born: A Saga of Seven Ages (1895)
Briton or Boer? A Tale of the Fight for Africa (1897)
The Romance of Golden Star (1897)
The Gold Finder (1898)
The Virgin of the Sun: A Tale of the Conquest of Peru (1898)
The Great Pirate Syndicate (1899)
Gambles with Destiny (1899)
Stories of Other Worlds (1900)
The Criminal Lunatic Asylum (1900)
In an Unknown Prison Land (1901)
Denver's Double: A Story of Inverted Identity (1901)
A Honeymoon in Space (1901) (fix-up of series first published in Pearson's Magazine as Stories of Other Worlds)
The White Witch of Mayfair (1902)
The Lake of Gold: A Narrative of the Anglo-American Conquest of Europe (1903)
A Woman Against the World (novel) (1903)
The World Masters (1903)
A Criminal Croesus (1904)
The Stolen Submarine: A Tale of the Japanese War (1904)
The Great Weather Syndicate (1906)
The Mummy and Miss Nitocris: A Phantasy of the Fourth Dimension (1906)
The World Peril of 1910 (1907)
The Destined Maid (1908)
The Sacred Skull (1908)
The Diamond Dog (1913)

George Griffith in print
From 2003 onwards Heliograph Inc. published editions of A Honeymoon in Space and Stories of Other Worlds, The Angel of the Revolution and The Syren of the Skies.

In 2006 Apogee Books released The World Peril of 1910 as part of its series of classic science fiction.

In 2008 Apogee released Around the World in 65 Days, an anthology of travel writing. The book collects Griffith's world travels, including one trip around the world done in a record-breaking 65 days. In addition, many of Griffith's other adventures are included. His trip to South America is recounted in "A Railway Beyond the Clouds", "A Ride to the City of the Sun", "A Paradise of Tomorrow", "The Most Majestic Mountain", and "Los Medanos". His travels of North America in "The Snake-Dancers of Arizona" are somehow even more exotic. Griffith claims to have made the first intentional flight across the English Channel in "To France by Air". In "When will the 20th Century Begin?", Griffith discusses the intricacies of time zones, something with which he had quite a lot of practice. The Apogee edition includes an introduction by Griffith's grandson, John Griffith, relating some of the family history, particularly of Alan Arnold Griffith, and a biography of George Griffith by editor Robert Godwin. 

In 2009, Leonaur Press released The Angel of the Revolution and Olga Romanoff as a two-volume set entitled Empire of the Air in both hardback and paperback.

In 2011 Apogee Books released A Honeymoon in Space.

Anthologies
Before Armageddon: An Anthology of Victorian and Edwardian Imaginative Fiction Published Before 1914  (1976)

Notes

References

External links
 
 Works by George Griffith at Project Gutenberg Australia
  
 
The Angel of the Revolution
Olga Romanoff
Stories of Other Worlds and A Honeymoon in Space
The Outlaws of the Air
The World Peril of 1910
A Corner in Lightning (short story)
Biography of Griffith
George Griffith in The Encyclopedia of Science Fiction, 3rd ed.

 

1857 births
1906 deaths
British science fiction writers
British socialists
British atheists
19th-century British novelists
British male novelists